is a group of complex volcanoes located in the northeast part of Nikkō National Park, Japan. Mount Nasu is one of the 100 Famous Japanese Mountains.

Major peaks 
Mount Nasu has the following major peaks:
 Sanbonyari Peak – 1916.9 m
 Chausu Peak – 1915 m
 Asahi Peak – 1896 m
 Minamigatsusan – 1776 m
 Kuro-oya Peak – 1589 m

Climate

Eruption 
It is estimated that Mount Nasu started erupting 600 thousand years ago. The eruption started from the north end of the mountain range, at Kashi-Asahi Peak. Only Chausu Peak is active today.

Access 
 Nasu Sancho Station of Nasu Ropeway
 Sandogoya Onsen Bus Stop of Kanto Transportation

Gallery

See also
 List of mountains in Japan

References

External links 

 Nasudake – Japan Meteorological Agency 
  – Japan Meteorological Agency
 Nasudake – Geological Survey of Japan
 

Nasudake
Nasudake
Volcanoes of Tochigi Prefecture
Volcanoes of Fukushima Prefecture
Volcanoes of Honshū